Synaphea divaricata is a shrub endemic to Western Australia.

It is found on slopes in the southern Wheatbelt and Goldfields-Esperance regions of Western Australia where it grows in sandy soils over quartzite.

References

Eudicots of Western Australia
divaricata
Endemic flora of Western Australia
Plants described in 1995